The railway from Larissa to Volos is a standard-gauge railway that connects Larissa with the coastal port city of Volos in Thessaly, Greece. It is Thessaly's most important regional line after the Palaiofarsalos–Kalambaka railway. As a branch line of the Piraeus–Platy railway, its western terminus at Larissa provides connections to Athens and Thessaloniki.

Course
The line branches off at Larissa and continues to the southeast through Kypseli, Armenio and Stefanovikeio before heading south to Velestino, where it meets the former metre-gauge line to Kalambaka. It then advances eastwards from Melissiatika to its eastern terminus at Volos.

Stations
The stations on the Larissa–Volos railway serve are:
 Larissa railway station (connecting to Athens, Thessaloniki and suburban Thessaloniki)
 Kypseli railway station
 Armenio railway station
 Stefanovikeio railway station 
 Velestino railway station 
 Melissiatika railway station (services suspended)
 Volos railway station

History
Construction of the metre-gauge railway began in 1882, and the line was inaugurated on 22 April 1884 as part of the Thessaly Railways. The project was designed and led by Italian-born Evaristo de Chirico, father of the famous painter Giorgio de Chirico, and Greek banker Theodoros Mavrogordatos. The original route was somewhat different from the current one, passing through the Volos quarry and proceeding to the centre of the city, where it met the narrow-gauge Pelion railway. In 1960, the decision was made to convert the line to standard gauge, thus speeding up travel times by allowing through traffic to bypass Larissa via the Piraeus–Platy railway.

Services
The Larissa–Volos railway is used by the following passenger services:
 TrainOSE regional service between Larissa and Volos. The journey time is 48 minutes.

Future 
The line is currently being upgraded with the installation of railway signalling, electrification and ETCS systems. At an estimated cost of €71.24 million, it is one of a number of "new-generation projects" aimed at improving rail connectivity across Greece.

References

External links
OSE

Railway lines in Greece
Standard gauge railways in Greece
Railway lines opened in 1884